Helmet Butte is a  summit located in the Glacier Peak Wilderness of the North Cascades in Washington state.

Description
Helmet Butte is situated on the crest of the Cascade Range, on the shared border of Snohomish County and Chelan County, also straddling the boundary between the Mount Baker-Snoqualmie National Forest and the Okanogan–Wenatchee National Forest. The nearest higher neighbor is line parent Fortress Mountain,  to the northeast. Precipitation runoff from the mountain drains southeast to Chiwawa River via Buck Creek; or west to the Suiattle River via Small Creek. Topographic relief is significant as the northern aspect of the mountain rises 2,000 feet above Small Creek in approximately one-half mile, and the south aspect rises 2,600 feet above Buck Creek in approximately one mile. This remote peak is situated  immediately northeast above Buck Creek Pass, and access is via the Buck Creek Pass Trail. This geographic feature was named by Albert Hale Sylvester, a pioneer surveyor, explorer, topographer, and forest supervisor in the Cascades who named thousands of natural features. He once wrote that of all the many places he had explored and visited in the Cascades he thought the most beautiful was the Buck Creek area, near Buck Creek Pass. This landform's name has been officially adopted by the U.S. Board on Geographic Names.

Geology

The North Cascades features some of the most rugged topography in the Cascade Range with craggy peaks, ridges, and deep glacial valleys. Geological events occurring many years ago created the diverse topography and drastic elevation changes over the Cascade Range leading to various climate differences.

The history of the formation of the Cascade Mountains dates back millions of years ago to the late Eocene Epoch. With the North American Plate overriding the Pacific Plate, episodes of volcanic igneous activity persisted. In addition, small fragments of the oceanic and continental lithosphere called terranes created the North Cascades about 50 million years ago. During the Pleistocene period dating back over two million years ago, glaciation advancing and retreating repeatedly scoured and shaped the landscape. Uplift and faulting in combination with glaciation have been the dominant processes which have created the tall peaks and deep valleys of the North Cascades area.

Extensive volcanic activity began to take place in the oligocene, about 35 million years ago. Due to Glacier Peak's proximity to Helmet Butte, volcanic ash is common in the area.

Climate
Helmet Butte is located in the marine west coast climate zone of western North America. Most weather fronts originate in the Pacific Ocean, and travel east toward the Cascade Mountains. As fronts approach the North Cascades, they are forced upward by the peaks of the Cascade Range, causing them to drop their moisture in the form of rain or snowfall onto the Cascades (Orographic lift). As a result, the west side of the North Cascades experiences high precipitation, especially during the winter months in the form of snowfall. Because of maritime influence, snow tends to be wet and heavy, resulting in high avalanche danger. During winter months, weather is usually cloudy, but due to high pressure systems over the Pacific Ocean that intensify during summer months, there is often little or no cloud cover during the summer.

See also

 Geography of the North Cascades

Gallery

References

External links
 Weather forecast: Helmet Butte
 Buck Creek Pass Trail 789: US Forest Service

Mountains of Washington (state)
Mountains of Chelan County, Washington
Mountains of Snohomish County, Washington
Cascade Range
North Cascades
Mount Baker-Snoqualmie National Forest
North American 2000 m summits